The Seventh Sun is the upcoming seventh studio album by British metalcore band Bury Tomorrow. The album will be released on 31 March 2023 through Music For Nations and it was produced by Dan Weller. It is the first album to feature the band's new rhythm guitarist Ed Hartwell and keyboardist/clean vocalist Tom Prendergast.

Background and promotion
Following the departure of Cameron, Bury Tomorrow performed at Slam Dunk Festival 2021 with two new members. The new members are Ed Hartwell (rhythm guitar) and Tom Prendergast (clean vocals and keyboards).

On 6 October, the band published the lead single "Abandon Us" and an accompanying music video. At the same time, they officially announced the album itself and release date, whilst also revealing the album cover and the track list. On 28 November, the band released the second single "Boltcutter" along with a music video. On 15 February 2023, the band released the third single "Heretic" featuring Loz Taylor of While She Sleeps and its corresponding music video. On 16 March, two weeks before the album release, the band premiered the fourth single "Begin Again".

Track listing
Adapted from Apple Music.

Personnel
Bury Tomorrow
 Daniel Winter-Bates – unclean vocals
 Kristan Dawson – lead guitar, backing vocals
 Ed Hartwell – rhythm guitar
 Davyd Winter-Bates – bass
 Adam Jackson – drums, percussion
 Tom Prendergast – keyboards, clean vocals

Additional musicians
 Lawrence "Loz" Taylor of While She Sleeps – guest vocals on track 8

Additional personnel
 Dan Weller – production, engineering, programming
 Ellis "The Power" Powell-Bevan – engineering
 Joseph McQueen – mixing
 Chris Athens – mastering

References

2023 albums
Bury Tomorrow albums
Music for Nations albums
Albums produced by Dan Weller
Upcoming albums